Apas Jumagulovich Jumagulov (born 19 September 1934) served as the Prime Minister of Kyrgyzstan from 14 December 1993 to 24 March 1998.

He studied geology and mineralogy at the Gubkin Russian State University of Oil and Gas in Moscow and began his political career in the Communist Party of the Kyrgyz SSR in 1973, becoming a Secretary in the Central Committee of the Party in 1979 and President of Council of Ministers of Kyrgyz SSR in 1986. Jumagulov and Absamat Masaliyev were the two original candidates for the Kyrgyz Presidency on 25 October 1990, but neither could get the majority of votes, so the Republic's Supreme Soviet chose Askar Akayev to be the first President on 27 October 1990. Jumagulov served as the ambassador to Germany from 1998 to 2003, and to Russia from 2005 to 2007.

External links
Apas Jumagulov at Radio Free Europe

1934 births
Living people
People from Chüy Region
Prime Ministers of Kyrgyzstan
Ambassadors of Kyrgyzstan to Germany
Central Committee of the Communist Party of the Soviet Union members
Communist Party of Kirghizia politicians
Eleventh convocation members of the Supreme Soviet of the Soviet Union
Members of the Congress of People's Deputies of the Soviet Union
Members of the Supreme Council (Kyrgyzstan)
Grand Crosses 1st class of the Order of Merit of the Federal Republic of Germany

Recipients of the Order of the Red Banner of Labour